The Adventures of Paper Peter is a 1990 Icelandic drama film directed by Ari Kristinsson. The film was selected as the Icelandic entry for the Best Foreign Language Film at the 63rd Academy Awards, but was not accepted as a nominee.

Cast
 Högni Snaer Hauksson
 Ingólfur Gudvarðarson
 Kristmann Óskarsson
 Magnús Ólafsson
 Rajeev Murukesevan
Rannveig Jónsdóttir

See also
 List of submissions to the 63rd Academy Awards for Best Foreign Language Film
 List of Icelandic submissions for the Academy Award for Best Foreign Language Film

References

External links
 

1991 films
1990 drama films
1990 films
1990s Icelandic-language films
Icelandic drama films
1991 drama films